The canton of Tonnay-Charente is an administrative division of the Charente-Maritime department, western France. Its borders were modified at the French canton reorganisation which came into effect in March 2015. Its seat is in Tonnay-Charente.

It consists of the following communes:

Breuil-Magné
Cabariot
Échillais
Genouillé
Loire-les-Marais
Lussant
Moragne
Muron
Port-des-Barques
Saint-Coutant-le-Grand
Saint-Hippolyte
Saint-Nazaire-sur-Charente
Soubise
Tonnay-Charente
Vergeroux

References

Cantons of Charente-Maritime